The 8th Legislative Yuan was a session of the Legislative Yuan of Taiwan, from 1 February 2012 to 31 January 2016. Members were elected in the 14 January 2012 legislative election. The ruling Kuomintang (KMT) controlled the Legislative Yuan.

The list is arranged by constituency (district) and proportional representation (party list).

Constituency

Proportional Representation

See also
 2012 Taiwan legislative election
 Seventh Legislative Yuan
 Ninth Legislative Yuan

 
08